Avia Pervia Modena was a historical men's volleyball club from the city of Modena.

History
The club's first nucleus was born in 1947 on the initiative of Professor Franco Modena Anderlini, he gathered a group of students, including Odone Federzoni, and Unione Sportiva Ferrari. In 1951 and 1952 Avia Pervia took part in the national championship. Also in 1952, the Ferrari was absorbed by the Circolo Sportivo Avia Pervia (the motto engraved on the coat of arms of the city of Modena), also attended by the tenor Luciano Pavarotti.
In subsequent years Avia Pervia, led again by Anderlini, fought for winning the league with two other Modena clubs, the Minelli and Villa d'Oro. Of the eleven consecutive titles won by companies of the Emilian city, five were won by Avia Pervia (1957, 1959, 1960, 1962, 1962–1963). After the second-place finishing at the end of the 1963–1964 season, behind emerging Ruini Firenze, Avia Pervia, overwhelmed by an economic crisis and disappeared.
The legacy of the glorious club was picked by the team of the Fire Department, the Menegola Modena, which Anderlini trained for two years in Serie B. After the Menegola was absorbed by the Sporting Group Panini (today Modena Volley), founded in 1966  by Benito entrepreneurs and Giuseppe Panini and considering descending Avia.

Honours & achievements
Italian League
 Winners (5): 1957, 1959, 1960, 1962, 1962–1963
 Runners-up (4): 1954, 1958, 1961, 1963–1964

References

Italian volleyball clubs
Modena
Volleyball clubs established in 1947
Sport in Emilia-Romagna